An English cricket team sponsored by Marylebone Cricket Club (MCC) visited Pakistan from December 1955 to February 1956 and played fourteen first-class matches including four against the Pakistan national cricket team.

The team

 Donald Carr (captain)
 Ken Barrington
 Brian Close
 Michael Cowan
 Tony Lock
 Alan Moss
 Jim Parks
 Peter Richardson
 Peter Sainsbury
 Harold Stephenson
 Billy Sutcliffe
 Roy Swetman
 Ian Thomson
 Fred Titmus
 Maurice Tompkin
 Allan Watkins

Thomson was not in the original team. He replaced the injured Cowan midway through the tour.

Pakistan v MCC series summary
 1st match at Bagh-e-Jinnah, Lahore – match drawn
 2nd match at Dacca Stadium, Dacca – Pakistan won by innings and 10 runs
 3rd match at Arbab Niaz Stadium, Peshawar – Pakistan won by 7 wickets
 4th match at National Stadium, Karachi – MCC won by 2 wickets

Idrees Baig incident
On the third evening of the match against Pakistan in Peshawar, some of the English players, fed up with what they regarded as the Pakistani umpire Idrees Baig's pomposity on the field and his bias in favour of Pakistan, kidnapped him, took him back to their hotel and tipped a bucket of water over him. The incident caused outrage in Pakistan and almost led to the abandonment of the tour, but diplomacy by the MCC president, Lord Alexander, and Iskander Mirza, the president of the Board of Control for Cricket in Pakistan, smoothed things over sufficiently to allow the tour to continue.

References

External links
 Marylebone Cricket Club in Pakistan 1955–56 at CricketArchive
 Marylebone Cricket Club in Pakistan, Dec 1955 - Mar 1956 at Cricinfo

Further reading
 "M.C.C. 'A' Team in Pakistan, 1955–56", Wisden 1957, pp. 791–812
 "The M.C.C. 'A' Tour", The Cricketer, Spring Annual, 1956 

1955 in English cricket
1955 in Pakistani cricket
1956 in English cricket
1956 in Pakistani cricket
1955-56
International cricket competitions from 1945–46 to 1960
Pakistani cricket seasons from 1947–48 to 1969–70